Exapate congelatella is a moth belonging to the family Tortricidae. The species was first described by Carl Alexander Clerck in 1759.

It is native to Europe.

References

Tortricinae